Wet infrastructure is the spectrum of water-related projects relating to water supply, treatment and storage, water resource management, flood management, coastal restoration, hydropower and renewable energy facilities.  Common examples of wet infrastructure include new construction as well as renovations and maintenance of locks, weirs, storm-surge barriers, guiding structures, pumping plants, culverts, bridges, controlling systems, operating systems, and tunnel installations.

References

External links
New Trends in Water and Environmental Engineering for Safety and Life, p. 104
The Scarcity of Water: Emerging Legal and Policy Responses, p. 17
Governance and Complexity in Water Management, p. 100

Water management
Water conservation
Water and the environment
Stormwater management
Water treatment